Brother and Sister is a 2022 French drama film directed by Arnaud Desplechin, starring Marion Cotillard and Melvil Poupaud as estranged siblings who are forced to reunite after two decades following the death of their parents. The film made its world premiere at the 2022 Cannes Film Festival where it competed for the Palme d'Or, and was released in theaters in France on the same day as its Cannes premiere, on 20 May 2022.

Plot
Alice and Louis are estranged siblings who are forced to reunite after the death of their parents, following two decades of silence between them.

Cast
 Marion Cotillard as Alice
 Melvil Poupaud as Louis
 Golshifteh Farahani as Faunia
 Cosmina Stratan as Lucia
 Patrick Timsit as Zwy
 Benjamin Siksou

Production
On 12 April 2021, Arte France Cinéma announced they were backing Arnaud Desplechin's next film, Brother and Sister. Marking Desplechin's third collaboration with Marion Cotillard after 1996's My Sex Life... or How I Got into an Argument and 2016's Ismael's Ghosts, and his second collaboration with Melvil Poupaud after 2008's A Christmas Tale. Golshifteh Farahani was announced in the cast on 16 January 2022. Grégoire Hetzel composed the score.

The film is a co-production between Why Not Productions and Arte France Cinéma.

Filming
Filming took place in Paris in October 2021, and in Lille and Roubaix in France between November and December 2021.

In order to create their characters tumultuous relationship, Marion Cotillard said she felt "a strange need" to remain distant from Melvil Poupaud on set, something she had never felt before, but she felt it was necessary for this film to remain at a distance and not become too close to him. At the end of the shoot, Cotillard explained to Poupaud why she avoided him and apologized. Poupaud then understood why Cotillard avoided him during filming and said he found that "admirable".

Promotion
The first image of the film featuring Marion Cotillard was unveiled on 16 April 2022.

French distributor Le Pacte unveiled the first poster for the film on Twitter on 25 April 2022. On 27 April 2022, eight film stills were released.

The first official trailer was released on 4 May 2022. The same trailer with English subtitles was released on 9 May 2022.

The clips from the film were released on 18 May 2022.

Release
The film had its world premiere at the 75th Cannes Film Festival in official competition on 20 May 2022. Distributor Le Pacte released the film theatrically in France at the same time of its Cannes premiere.

Brother and Sister'''s official soundtrack album was released on 4 July 2022.

Home video
The film was released on DVD and Blu-Ray in France on 26 October 2022. Both versions include deleted scenes and an interview with director Arnaud Desplechin.

Reception
Critical response
AlloCiné, a French cinema website, gave the film an average rating of 4.1/5, based on a survey of 25 French reviews.

Eric Neuhoff of Le Figaro gave the film five stars, stating, "It's called grace. Desplechin masters his subject from A to Z. Images are his natural language. He's not afraid of words either. He is a complete athlete of the cinema. He was believed to be Truffaut's heir. He is becoming our Bergman."

Thierry Cheze of Première gave the film four stars, writing, "After the disappointing Deception, Desplechin is back in great shape with a film in which he explores family love/hate stories with an ever so fascinating dexterity. Marion Cotillard finds one of her finest roles here."Cahiers du Cinéma gave the film four stars, stating, "The beauty of Brother and Sister made our desire to meet Arnaud Desplechin urgent."

The Film Stage included Brother and Sister on its list of "The Best Undistributed Films of 2022", stating; Brother and Sister, Arnaud Desplechin’s tale of feuding siblings who re-enter each other's orbits after their parents get in a car accident, is the sort of heightened melodrama that will have some viewers laughing or sneering (or some combination of both). But if you're open to Desplechin’s directorial whims or have an interest in fraught familial relationships, Brother and Sister is a compelling effort—defiant in its handling of conventional drama and unafraid to be as flawed as its characters."

Box office
In France, Brother and Sister'' was released to 296 screens, where it debuted at number four at the box office, selling 73,784 tickets. It sold a total of 235,198 tickets after 9 weeks in cinemas.

Accolades

References

External links
 
 
 Brother and Sister at Cannes Film Festival
 Press Kit (PDF)

2022 films
2022 drama films
2020s French-language films
Films about siblings
Films directed by Arnaud Desplechin
Films with screenplays by Arnaud Desplechin
Films set in France
Films shot in France
French drama films
2020s French films